Martin G. Houle (born February 12, 1985) is a Canadian former professional ice hockey goaltender who played one game in the National Hockey League (NHL) for the Philadelphia Flyers during the  season.

Playing career
As a youth, Houle played in the 1999 Quebec International Pee-Wee Hockey Tournament with the Richelieu Éclaireurs minor ice hockey team.

Houle played junior ice hockey for the Cape Breton Screaming Eagles of the Quebec Major Junior Hockey League from 2001 to 2005. He ended the 2003-04 season ranked second in the league with 34 wins and a 2.32 GAA. He was awarded the Jacques Plante Memorial Trophy as the QMJHL goaltender of the year, named a QMJHL first-team all-star, and a Canadian Hockey League second-team all-star. House was drafted by the Philadelphia Flyers 232nd overall in the 2004 NHL Entry Draft. He was named the QMJHL Defensive Player of the Year, and finished 7th in the QMJHL in wins (26) and 5th in GAA (2.51).

Following his senior season in the QMJHL, he attended Flyers training camp, but was reassigned to the Trenton Titans of the ECHL at the close of the Philadelphia Phantoms training camp. Houle had played seven straight games for the Titans after Scott Stirling was traded to the San Antonio Rampage. In those seven games, he managed to put together the sixth best goals against average in the ECHL.

The Phantoms liked what they saw in him and decided to switch him with Rejean Beauchemin, who was struggling early in the season. At the AHL level, Houle excelled. However, the test truly came when Jamie Storr was called up to be backup goalie for Antero Niittymäki while Robert Esche was on the injury list. With Storr in the National Hockey League, Houle became the starting goalie and retained this for the rest of the season.

Scheduled to be a restricted free agent following the 2007-08 season, Houle became an unrestricted free agent when the Flyers didn't extend him a qualifying offer. Houle eventually signed with the ECHL's Las Vegas Wranglers, but after three games and recording a 1-2-0 record with a 3.03 GAA, Houle was traded to the Cincinnati Cyclones.

Career statistics

Regular season

Playoffs

References

External links
 

1985 births
Canadian ice hockey goaltenders
Cape Breton Screaming Eagles players
Cincinnati Cyclones (ECHL) players
Ice hockey people from Montreal
Las Vegas Wranglers players
Living people
Philadelphia Flyers draft picks
Philadelphia Flyers players
Philadelphia Phantoms players
Trenton Titans players
Wheeling Nailers players